The 1992–93 Slovenian Football Cup was the second season of the Slovenian Football Cup, Slovenia's football knockout competition.

Qualified clubs

1992–93 Slovenian PrvaLiga members
Beltinci
Celje
Gorica
Izola
Koper
Krka
Ljubljana
Maribor
Mura
Nafta Lendava
Naklo
Olimpija
Rudar Velenje
Slovan
Steklar
Svoboda
Zagorje
Železničar Maribor

Qualified through MNZ Regional Cups
MNZ Ljubljana:  Domžale, Belinka
MNZ Maribor: Limbuš Pekre, Korotan Prevalje
MNZ Celje: Žalec
MNZ Koper: Piran
MNZ Nova Gorica: Primorje
MNZ Murska Sobota: Radgona, Čarda
MNZ Lendava: Turnišče
MNZG-Kranj: Triglav Kranj, Kranj
MNZ Ptuj: Drava Ptuj, Podvinci

First round

|}

Round of 16

|}

Quarter-finals

|}

Semi-finals

|}

Final

Slovenian Football Cup seasons
Cup
Slovenian Cup